The Jabez Bacon House is a historic house on Hollow Road in Woodbury, Connecticut.  Built in 1760 for a prominent regional merchant, it is a well-preserved example of Georgian architecture.  It was listed on the National Register of Historic Places in 1971.

Description and history
The Jabez Bacon House stands near the southern end of Woodbury's main village, on the north side of Hollow Road between Sycamore and Main Streets.  It is a -story wood-frame structure, with a dormered gambrel roof, central chimney, and clapboarded exterior.  It is five bays wide, with a slightly overhanging second story.  The front entry is centered, with a reproduction surround consisting of flanking pilasters and a pedimented gable above.  The three roof dormers also exhibit full pediments.  The interior of the house follows a typical Georgian central chimney plan, but has a wider than usual entry vestibule with staircase.  The interior retains original paneled wall finishes, and many rooms have original flooring.  The living room includes a period cabinet, and the chimney includes two surviving period ovens.

The house was built in 1760 by Roswell Moore, a prominent local carpenter.  He built it for Jabez Bacon, a merchant and banker who operated a store next door, and sent traders as far west as present-day Ohio.  It was later acquired by Daniel Curtiss, who also operated a merchant business.  Curtiss notably trained as a salesman Collis Potter Huntington, who later became prominent for his role in construction of the transcontinental railway.

See also
Glebe House (Woodbury, Connecticut), a house museum nearby on Hollow Road
National Register of Historic Places listings in Litchfield County, Connecticut

References

Houses on the National Register of Historic Places in Connecticut
National Register of Historic Places in Litchfield County, Connecticut
Georgian architecture in Connecticut
Houses completed in 1760
Houses in Litchfield County, Connecticut
Woodbury, Connecticut
Historic district contributing properties in Connecticut